Gibsons is a coastal community of 4,605 in southwestern British Columbia, Canada on the Strait of Georgia.

Although it is on the mainland, the Sunshine Coast is not accessible by road. Vehicle access is by BC Ferries from Horseshoe Bay in West Vancouver, a 40-minute crossing; or by a ferry from Powell River to Earls Cove, north of Sechelt. The town is also accessible by water, by float plane to the harbour, and by small aircraft to Sechelt Airport, approx. 20 km to the northwest.

Gibsons is best known in Canada as the setting of the popular and long running CBC Television series The Beachcombers, which aired from 1972 to 1990. The storefront "Molly's Reach" (now a cafe), the restored tug Persephone, and a display about the series at the Sunshine Coast Museum and Archives are popular attractions. Other films that have used Gibsons as a location include Charlie St. Cloud (2010), starring Kim Basinger and Zac Efron (as a stand-in for Marblehead, Massachusetts); and Needful Things (1993), starring Max von Sydow and Ed Harris.

History
The land currently known as Gibsons has been inhabited by First Nations people since time immemorial. It is part of the traditional and ancestral lands of the Sḵwx̱wú7mesh Úxwumixw, which also includes parts of Greater Vancouver and the Squamish River watershed. Sḵwx̱wú7mesh oral history tells that the region around Gibsons was the birthplace of the Squamish people after what is called The Great Flood.

The European settlement town of Gibsons was established in 1886 by George Gibson and his sons. It was incorporated in 1929 as Gibson's Landing, and in 1947 was renamed Gibsons at the residents' request. The town two main sections are:

 Lower Gibsons, the mostly residential seaside area that includes Gibsons Marina, Molly's Reach, and Winegarden Park, with an auditorium that hosts live performances in the summer. It also has shops and restaurants catering mostly to vacationers.
 Upper Gibsons, along the Sunshine Coast Highway (BC Highway 101), with commercial areas including Sunnycrest Mall, the town's two major supermarkets, a variety of fast food restaurants, the largest elementary school, and the high school.

Gibsons is the first town in British Columbia to accept styrofoam at its recycling facility, the Gibsons Recycling Depot. Its staff has traveled widely to promote styrofoam recycling; founder Buddy Boyd was invited to address an international Zero Waste conference in Florianopolis, Brazil.

Economy
The Sunshine Coast has seen a three-decade transition from a forestry- and fishing-based economy to a more diverse one with construction trades, business services, retail and tourism becoming prominent.

Gibsons is a popular retirement destination. It has also attracted artists and musicians, professionals who commute by ferry into nearby Vancouver, and remote workers.

Between 2001 and 2006, its population grew 7.1% compared with BC's overall growth rate of 5.3%. In 2006, the median resident age was 50.2 years, compared with the provincial median of 40.8 years.

Climate
Gibsons is in a temperate coastal climate, with mild, rainy winters and warm, dry summers. The regions's landscape is in a temperate rainforest.

Demographics 

Ethnicity

Religion 
According to the 2021 census, religious groups in Gibsons included:
Irreligion (2,810 persons or 61.4%)
Christianity (1,515 persons or 33.1%)
Buddhism (75 persons or 1.6%)
Judaism (30 persons or 0.7%)
Sikhism (30 persons or 0.7%)
Hinduism (25 persons or 0.5%)
Islam (25 persons or 0.5%)
Other (75 persons or 1.6%)

Notable people 
Ryan Dempster – major league baseball pitcher
Bruno Gerussi - actor, The Beachcombers
Peter Trower - poet and novelist 
Ken Bell  - Canadian photographer during WWII
Lyn Vernon  – mezzo-soprano (later dramatic soprano), conductor, teacher 
Paul George – environmentalist
Todd Bentley – evangelist
J.S. Woodsworth - politician, founder of the Canadian Commonwealth Foundation (predecessor to the New Democratic Party)
Grace MacInnis – politician and feminist
Paul Rudolph – cyclist and former guitarist & vocalist with the Pink Fairies
Don S. Davis – actor known for his roles as General George S. Hammond on Stargate SG-1 and Major Garland Briggs on Twin Peaks.
Devin Townsend – musician and frontman for Strapping Young Lad, Devin Townsend Project, and Devin Townsend Band.
Celso Machado - Brazilian guitarist and multi-instrumentalist
Garth "GGGarth" Richardson - music producer and recording engineer
Aristazabal Hawkes – bassist for the English indie rock band, a Mercury Music Prize, BRIT Awards and NME Awards nominee Guillemots (band)
Silas White – publisher, musician and politician
Skye Wallace - singer-songwriter
Warne Livesey - music producer and recording engineer for Midnight Oil and Matthew Good
Joey Cramer – actor
Velcrow Ripper - filmmaker

Awards 
Gibsons has won a number of awards:
In February 2005, Gibsons won the Berkeley Springs International Water Tasting contest, coming first in the world.

In October 2009, the town was declared the "Most Liveable Community in the World" (under 20,000 population) at the international Livcom Awards. Endorsed by the United Nations Environment Programme, the LivCom competition focuses on best practices for local environmental management.

In 2009 Gibsons won an Energy & Climate Action Award for Community Planning and Development from the Community Energy Association.  A major factor in the award was a new housing development, which will be heated by Canada's first publicly owned geoexchange system.
 World's Most Livable Community of under 20,000 (2009), United Nations-endorsed International Awards for Liveable Communities (LivCom). Gibsons also received First Place among all world cities in LivCom's "Planning for the Future" category.
 Energy & Climate Action Award in Community Planning and Development (2009), awarded by the Community Energy Association for development of the Upper Gibsons Neighbourhood Plan.
 Communities in Bloom awards – 2008 Provincial Champions; 2007 Provincial Champions award for Environmental Awareness; 2006 Provincial Champions for best floral displays.
 Best in the World Municipal Water (2005) award, Berkeley Springs Winter Festival of the Waters.
 OCP award, SmartGrowth BC, 2007
 National Research Council award for environmentally-sensitive development (2006)

Notes

References

External links

Populated places on the British Columbia Coast
Towns in British Columbia
Populated places in the Sunshine Coast Regional District
Populated places established in 1886
1886 establishments in British Columbia